The 2015 Spa-Francorchamps GP3 Series round was a GP3 Series motor race held on August 22 and 23, 2015 at Circuit de Spa-Francorchamps, Belgium. It was the fiveth round of the 2015 GP3 Series. The race supported the 2015 Belgian Grand Prix.

Classification

Qualifying

Feature race

See also 
 2015 Belgian Grand Prix
 2015 Spa-Francorchamps GP2 Series round

References 

Spa-Francorchamps
GP3